Arthroleptis hematogaster is a species of frog in the family Arthroleptidae. It is endemic to the Itombwe and Kabobo highlands in the eastern Democratic Republic of the Congo.

References

hematogaster
Amphibians described in 1954
Endemic fauna of the Democratic Republic of the Congo
Amphibians of the Democratic Republic of the Congo
Taxa named by Raymond Laurent
Taxonomy articles created by Polbot